Tom McLaughlin may refer to:

 Tom McLaughlin (baseball) (1860–1921), Major League Baseball infielder
 Tom McLaughlin (soccer) (born 1976), retired American soccer forward

See also
 Thomas McLaughlin (disambiguation)
 Tom McLachlan (1912–1986), Australian rugby league footballer
 Tom McLoughlin (born 1950), American screenwriter, film/television director